Municipal elections were held in Israel on October 30, 2018. A run-off was held on November 13 in localities where a candidate for mayor received at least 40% of the vote.

For the first time, the four local councils in Druze localities in the Golan Heights were up for election. Elections were held in all 54 regional councils, 122 out of 124 local councils, and 75 out of 77 cities. The cities of Baqa al-Gharbiyye and Tayibe, as well as the local council of Jatt, did not hold elections, as elections were held there in 2015. In Tel Mond, a local council, a split commission is currently serving. Further, RC Rekhasim, LC Ghajar, and 3 more places only had one list be submitted for the council elections, and was automatically elected by a walkover, without any ballots cast. In all except Kfar Shmaryahu, where three candidates had been nominated, the mayoral election was also decided by walkover.

In these elections, the then-longest-serving mayors in Israel, Shlomo Bohbot of Ma'alot-Tarshiha and Ephraim Deri of Kfar Yona, who had served for nine terms consecutively, were defeated in their re-election bids.

Voter turnout
The elections of 2018 were the first municipal elections in Israel where a paid day off work was enacted for the first round of voting, in hopes of increasing voter turnout. Total turnout in the first round of voting was 59.5%. By comparison, the turnout in 2013 stood at 51.8%.

By city

Jerusalem

The results of the first round of voting in Jerusalem, with 254,326 voters participating of 638,065 eligible (a 39.86% turnout), are as follows. Of the 254,326 votes, 248,585 were valid.

The results of the second round of voting in Jerusalem are as follows. The voter turnout was 35%.

The following parties gained seats in the city council. The parties that failed to gain seats are: I'm Jerusalem (Avi Salman), Elders and Pensioners of Jerusalem, Jerusalem on the Road to the Summit (Nehemia Assaf), Jerusalem Our Home (Ilya Liptzker), Jerusalem My City (Ramadan Dabash), Our Jerusalem (Moshe Lion), For the Neighborhoods (Avi Shalom), Me'orav Yerushalmi (Evyatar Elbaz), Pisgat Ze'ev on the Map (Ya'el Antebi), and Youth of Jerusalem (Yakir Jarasi).

Tel Aviv

The results in Tel Aviv, with 203,018 voters participating of 440,205 eligible (a 46.12% turnout), are as follows. Of the 203,018 votes, 194,451 were valid.

The following parties gained seats on the city council. The parties that failed to get seats are: Unifying Tel Aviv, South of the City (Suzy Cohen Tzemah), Halo – Women of the City, The Tel Aviv List, Yair Tzabari, Local in Tel Aviv – Youth in the City (Yotam Shamir), Changing Direction (Nir Levi), Making Aliyah Together, Green City, City for All, and Vegan Tel Aviv (Omer Shalev).

Haifa

The results in Haifa, with 125,333 voters participating of 256,559 eligible (a 48.85% turnout), are as follows. Of the 125,333 votes, 118,271 were valid.

The following lists failed to gain any seats on the city council: Lovers of Haifa (Israel Ya'akov Savyon), Perspective for Haifa (Meir Levi), Balad, Haifans for Haifa, Haifa Awakens (Mendi Salzmann), Haifana, Kulanu (Elad Attias), Heart of the Neighborhoods (Tali Meshulam–Itach), Lechaim (Alex Abramov), Local in the Neighborhood (Boaz Gur), Disabled and Winning (Gil Goldreich), Strength, Voice of the People, and Rami Levi Biki Morad.

For the lists that entered the city council, the results are as follows:

Rishon LeZion
The results in Rishon LeZion, with 108,068 voters participating of 209,511 eligible (a 51.58% turnout), are as follows. Of the 108,068 votes, 104,095 were valid. A second round was held in the mayoral election.

The results of the second round of voting in Rishon LeZion are as follows. The voter turnout was 34.2%.

The following lists failed to gain any seats on the city council: Unity, Achievements (Meir Akiva), Our Rights and Social Justice (Vlad Kapustin), Trabelsi Hai Shimon, The Crocheted and Social (Ohad Uzan), Social Action (Kobi Dahan), Social Justice (Adamso Alali), and Rishon LeZion Together (Roei Yagna). For lists that gained seats, the results are as follows.

Petah Tikva
The results in Petah Tikva, with 108,563 voters participating of 193,736 eligible (a 56.04% turnout), are as follows. Of the 108,563 votes, 104,671 were valid.

The following lists did not gain enough seats to enter the city council: One of Ours, With Us (Haim Bashari), Us, Together, The Present, Petah Tikva Our Home, and Young Leadership for Real. Of the lists that entered the city council, the results are as follows.

Ashdod
The results in Ashdod, with 121,245 voters participating of 182,983 eligible (a 66.26% turnout), are as follows. Of the 121,245 votes, 118,363 were valid.

The following lists did not gain enough seats to enter the city council: A New Voice, Ashdod United, Ashdod Awakens (Naor Biton), There is an Alternative, Ashdod Community, Voice of the Heart, and Integration. Of the lists that entered the city council, the results are as follows.

Netanya
The results in Netanya, with 89,371 voters participating of 186,792 eligible (a 47.85% turnout), are as follows. Of the 89,371 votes, 83,258 were valid.

The following lists did not gain enough seats to enter the city council: The Way (Wagif Eliav), The New Ones (Amir Sinai), Local in Netanya (Daniel Maharat), Our Netanya (Yoni Giorno), Netanyans and Youth (Tzvika Lieber), and Hope (Amos Dirsau). Of the lists that entered the city council, the results are as follows.

Beersheba
The results in Beersheba, with 83,436 voters participating of 166,800 eligible (a 50.02% turnout), are as follows. Of the 83,436 votes, 78,161 were valid.

The following lists did not gain enough seats to enter the city council: Be'er Sheva We Deserve More, Pleasant Ways, Strength in Unity, Light (Moshe Yanai), and Voice of Be'er Sheva (Yitzhak Dahan). Of the lists that entered the city council, the results are as follows.

Results

Cities

Local councils

References

municipal
2018
October 2018 events in Asia
2018 in Israeli politics